In 1973, Christopher Cloud was the name of a band assembled by Tommy Boyce of Boyce and Hart fame. They released an album called Blown Away on Chelsea Records (BCL1-0234) that same year. The band featured members of the group AIM. Boyce used an alias on the record of "Tomme" and his image (hidden behind clouds) was used for the cover. This album has never been reissued on CD. It is to note that the last song on side A (Thank God For Rock'n Roll) is not referenced anywhere but on the actual record label. 

Two singles were released from the album, "Thank God for Rock 'N Roll" / "Krush on Kris" (BCBO-0101) and "Zip A Dee Doo Dah" / "Interpretation Of War" (78-0118), both featuring non-LP B-sides.

AIM released an album in 1974 called Aim For The Highest on Blue Thumb Records (BST64).

Track listing
 "Brand New Boogie at 10AM" (Michael Overly, Tommy Boyce)
 "Friendly Sabotage" (Michael Overly, Tommy Boyce)
 "Celebration" (Tomme)
 "Do You Want Me for Five Minutes?" (Tomme)
 "Thank God For Rock'n Roll" (Boyce-Boyce)
 "I Heard It All Thru The Wall" (Michael Overly, Tommy Boyce)
 "Cecilia" (Paul Simon)
 "Dr. Moss" (Tomme)
 "Zip a Dee Doo Dah" (Allie Wrubel, Ray Gilbert)
 "Sandra, The Cat Lover"

Personnel
 Tomme (Tommy Boyce) and Michael Overly - vocals
 Michael Overly - vocals, lead guitar
 Patrick O'Connor - bass guitar
 Buggs Pemberton - drums
 Ben Benay - harmonica
 Nino Tempo - saxophone
 Christopher Cloud (Tommy Boyce) - arrangements
 Tomme (Tommy Boyce) - producer

External links
 Tommyboyce.com
 12tonemusic.com
 Mike Overly

Songwriting teams
RCA Victor artists
Place of birth missing
1973 debut albums